Stanley Charles Steer  (2 June 1900 – 10 December 1997) was an Anglican bishop.

He was born in Farnham and educated at the Royal Grammar School, Guildford and the   University of Saskatchewan.

He was successively
Missionary at Vanderhoof, British Columbia
Chaplain, St Mark's Church, Alexandria, British Columbia
Chaplain and Fellow, University College, Oxford
Chaplain, The Mercers' Company, City of London
Principal, Emmanuel College, Saskatoon
Bishop of Saskatoon

References

1900 births
1997 deaths
20th-century Anglican Church of Canada bishops
People from Farnham
People educated at Royal Grammar School, Guildford
University of Saskatchewan alumni
Fellows of University College, Oxford
Anglican bishops of Saskatoon